The British International School of New York (BIS-NY) was established in 2006 at Waterside Plaza, an upscale development on the East River in the Kips Bay neighborhood of Manhattan, New York City. The student body is a mix of British expatriates, American nationals and students from a mix of other countries, and includes both boys and girls. The school serves students from age three up to upper school. Its facilities include a swimming pool, secured playground, gymnasium, and Smart Boards in every classroom. The school offers rolling admissions, so that children can enter the school throughout the year, as long as there is space available. This is particularly helpful for families who have been transferred internationally at short notice.

The school teaches a mix of the English National Curriculum blended with the methodology of the International Baccalaureate. French and Spanish are taught at every level of the school, with other languages available as after-school options. Individual music lessons are also offered in addition to the class lessons, and a summer camp is run through the months of June to August.

The school's enrollment has increased regularly, which has led to the school's continued expansion. Recently, the school opened a new building adjacent to the cafeteria which contains an office and two classrooms specifically designed to meet the needs of the older students as they head into middle school. From September 2018 the school launched its Upper School, with IGCSE and A-Level programmes to its students.

The British International School of New York is the sister school of Abercorn School in London, England and has been recognised as a Good Schools Guide International School as well as being accredited by the International Baccalaureate as a World School and COBIS and ISI accredited.

Clubs and extracurricular activities 
The school has a debate team that participates in the English-speaking Union Big Apple Debate league.

Most clubs run from 3:30pm–4:30pm on school days, though some clubs can run to 5:30 or 6:00. The clubs include Arabic, Ballet, Chess, Coding, Fencing, Global Chefs, Ice Skating, Karate, Mandarin, Robotics, Table Tennis and Yoga.

Some notable clubs of the school are Empire State of Sound (The school's show choir) and the school play. Which recent performances have included Peter Pan, Wizard of Oz, Bye Bye Birdie and Beauty and the Beast. With casts of up to 70 children from grades 3–8.

Houses 
The student body is divided into three houses: Glennie, Shakespeare, and King. Students are placed into these houses on arrival to the school. Students play games in their houses and raise money for the charity that their house supports.

See also
American schools in the United Kingdom:
 The American School in London
 American School in England

References
Notes

External links

Article in The New York Times 
Abercorn School, London official website
Nursery's website

Article in the New York Sun
The Blackboard Awards
British American Business welcomes BIS-NY
Waterside Plaza News

British-American culture in New York (state)
British international schools in the United States
International Baccalaureate schools in New York (state)
Educational institutions established in 2006
Private K-12 schools in Manhattan
Kips Bay, Manhattan
International schools in New York City
2006 establishments in New York City
For profit schools in Manhattan